Elections to Cannock Chase District Council took place on 5 May 2011 on the same day as other local elections in England and the Alternative Vote referendum. A total of 15 councillors were elected from all of the council's wards as a third of the council was up for election.

The Labour Party was aiming to supplant the Liberal Democrats as the largest party on the council. The Conservatives were aiming to build on modest gains made in 2010, particularly from the Liberal Democrats around Rugeley. The result had the potential to have a significant impact on the dominance of the Conservative / Liberal Democrat coalition on the council.

Following the election, Labour emerged as the largest party on the council, albeit short of the 21 seats required for an overall majority. They gained two seats, one from the Conservatives and another from the Liberal Democrats. They also successfully held on to their seats won at the 2007 election and went on to form a minority administration following the election.

The Conservatives came a fairly close second in terms of vote share but won less than half the number of seats that Labour did. Despite losing a seat to Labour in Hednesford, they still managed a net gain of one seat thanks to them winning two seats from the Liberal Democrats in Rawnsley and Rugeley.

The Liberal Democrats had won five wards when these seats were last contested and were the largest party on the council with 17 seats. However, their three-seat loss, combined with councillors who had defected to them not standing for re-election, meant that the Liberal Democrats slipped to being the third largest party with 11 seats.

Also standing was one candidate from the British National Party and two candidates from The Chase Independent Party; none of these candidates were successful and so there remained only three parties represented on the council.

Election result

Council Composition
Prior to the election, the composition of the council was:

After the election, the composition of the council was:

Ward results
Vote share changes are based on the results achieved by parties in 2007 when these seats were last contested.

Brereton and Ravenhill

Cannock East

Cannock North

Cannock South

Cannock West

Etching Hill and The Heath

Hagley

Hawks Green

Heath Hayes East and Wimblebury

Hednesford Green Heath

Hednesford North

Hednesford South

Norton Canes

Rawnsley

Western Springs

References

2011 English local elections
2011
2010s in Staffordshire